Shiniu Township is a rural township in Shuangfeng County, Hunan Province, People's Republic of China.

Administrative division
The township is divided into 60 villages, the following areas: 
 
 Xinsheng Village
 Yanshi Village
 Xinli Village
 Shizi Village
 Yongjia Village
 Xiannvdian Village
 Jinfeng Village
 Hongwei Village
 Paixingshan Village
 Qiaoting Village
 Xinnong Village
 Baizhu Village
 Shigu Village
 Shanshan Village
 Tianshiling Village
 Xiaodong Village
 Longshang Village
 Baishu Village
 Wanzhou Village
 Shushan Village
 Shuxin Village
 Shuanghe Village
 Huangni Village
 Youyuan Village
 Mushan Village
 Xinfeng Village
 Jifu Village
 Xiaoshui Village
 Taolin Village
 Yuxing Village
 Changfeng Village
 Shiniu Village
 Lianglong Village
 Caisang Village
 Hengcheng Village
 Hongjia Village
 Daojia Village
 Shankou Village
 Qizhang Village
 Bajiao Village
 Ma'an Village
 Shuangxin Village
 Tianming Village
 Changhan Village
 Wuyi Village
 Shangduan Village
 Xiaoyuan Village
 Yatian Village
 Shuangjiang Village
 Dishui Village
 Chayuan Village
 Gaoxian Village
 Tianjin Village
 Guyun Village
 Chengchong Village
 Nanchong Village
 Jiufeng Village
 Shuikou Village
 Shilong Village
 Liangsi Village

External links

Divisions of Shuangfeng County